Amir Hadj Massaoued (Arabic:أمير الحاج مسعود) (born 8 February 1981) is a Tunisian football player.

He was part of the Tunisian 2004 Olympic football team, who exited in the first round, finishing third in group C, behind group and gold medal winners Argentina and runners-up Australia. He was also selected for the 2005 FIFA Confederations Cup, but did not appear in any matches.

Messaoud suffered a double-fracture of his leg from a reckless tackle during a Tunisian Ligue Professionnelle 1 match in December 2007.

References

External links
 

1981 births
Living people
Tunisian footballers
2005 FIFA Confederations Cup players
Footballers at the 2004 Summer Olympics
Olympic footballers of Tunisia
Tunisia international footballers
CS Sfaxien players
Stade Tunisien players
Club Africain players
Association football defenders
ES Zarzis players
Tunisian Ligue Professionnelle 1 players